Captain John Harties Brown (1834 to January 30, 1905) was a Canadian soldier who fought in the American Civil War. Brown received the United States' highest award for bravery during combat, the Medal of Honor, for his action during the Second Battle of Franklin in Tennessee on 30 November 1864. He was honored with the award on 13 February 1865.

Biography
John Brown was born in New Brunswick in 1834. He initially joined the 5th Massachusetts Infantry from Charlestown, Massachusetts in April 1861, mustering out the following July. He joined the 36th Massachusetts Infantry as a sergeant in July 1862. In August 1863, he was commissioned as a Captain with the 12th Kentucky Infantry, and mustered out with this regiment in July 1865. John Brown was buried in Arlington National Cemetery.

Medal of Honor citation

See also

List of American Civil War Medal of Honor recipients: A–F

References

1834 births
1905 deaths
Burials at Arlington National Cemetery
Canadian-born Medal of Honor recipients
Pre-Confederation Canadian emigrants to the United States
People from New Brunswick
People of Massachusetts in the American Civil War
Union Army officers
United States Army Medal of Honor recipients
American Civil War recipients of the Medal of Honor